A hill station is a town located at a higher elevation than the nearby plain or valley. The term was used mostly in colonial Asia (particularly in India), but also in Africa (albeit rarely), for towns founded by European colonialists as refuges from the summer heat and, as Dale Kennedy observes about the Indian context, "the hill station ... was seen as an exclusive British preserve: here it was possible to render the Indian into an outsider".

History 

Nandi Hills is a hill station in Karnataka, India which was developed by Ganga Dynasty in 11th century. It was also used by Tipu Sultan (1751 - 1799) as a summer retreat.

Hill stations in British India were established for a variety of reasons. One of the first reasons in the early 1800s, was for the place to act as a sanitorium for the ailing family members of British officials. After the rebellion of 1857, the British "sought further distance from what they saw as a disease-ridden land by [escaping] to the Himalayas in the north". Other factors included anxieties about the dangers of life in India, among them "fear of degeneration brought on by too long residence in a debilitating land". The hill stations were meant to reproduce the home country, illustrated in Lord Lytton's statement about Ootacamund in the 1870s as having "such beautiful English rain, such delicious English mud." Shimla was officially made the "summer capital of India" in the 1860s and hill stations "served as vital centres of political and military power, especially after the 1857 revolt." 

As noted by Indian historian Vinay Lal, hill stations in India also served "as spaces for the colonial structuring of a segregational and ontological divide between Indians and Europeans, and as institutional sites of imperial power."
 William Dalrymple wrote that "The viceroy was the spider at the heart of Simla's web: From his chambers in Viceregal Lodge, he pulled the strings of an empire that stretched from Rangoon in the east to Aden in the west." Meanwhile Judith T Kenny observed that "the hill station as a landscape type tied to nineteenth-century discourses of imperialism and climate. Both discourses serve as evidence of a belief in racial difference and, thereby, the imperial hill station reflected and reinforced a framework of meaning that influenced European views of the non-western world in general." The historian of Himalayan cultures Shekhar Pathak speaking about the development of Hill Stations like Mussoorie noted that “the needs of this (European) elite created colonies in Dehradun of Indians to cater to them." This "exclusive, clean, and secure social space – known as an enclave – for white Europeans ... evolved to become the seats of government and foci of elite social activity", and created racial distinctions which perpetuated British colonial power and oppression as Nandini Bhattacharya notes. Dale Kennedy observed that "the hill station, then, was seen as an exclusive British preserve: here it was possible to render the Indian into an outsider". 

Kennedy, following Monika Bührlein, identifies three stages in the evolution of hill stations in India: high refuge, high refuge to hill station, and hill station to town. The first settlements started in the 1820s, primarily as sanitoria. In the 1840s and 1850s, there was a wave of new hill stations, with the main impetus being "places to rest and recuperate from the arduous life on the plains". In the second half of the 19th century, there was a period of consolidation with few new hill stations. In the final phase, "hill stations reached their zenith in the late nineteenth century. The political importance of the official stations was underscored by the inauguration of large and costly public-building projects."

List of hill stations 

Most hill stations, listed by region:

Africa

Madagascar 

 Antsirabe

Morocco 

 Ifrane

Nigeria 
 Jos

Uganda 
 Fort Portal

Americas

Brazil 
 Petropolis
 Campos do Jordão

Costa Rica 
 Monteverde

United States 
 Beech Mountain
 Sky Valley, Georgia
 Big Bear Lake, California
 Cloudcroft, New Mexico
 Summerhaven, Arizona

Asia

Bangladesh 

 Sajek Valley
Bandarban
 Jaflong
 Khagrachari
 Moulvibazar
 Rangamati
 Sreemangal

Cambodia 

 Bokor Hill Station

China 
 Kuling (Guling) in Jiangxi Province
 Mount Mogan
 Mount Jigong
 Guling, Fujian Province
 Beidaihe

Cyprus 

 Platres

Hong Kong 
 Victoria Peak
 Sunset Peak

India 

Hundreds of hill stations are located in India. Nandi Hills is a hill station in Karnataka, India which was developed by Ganga Dynasty in 11th century. It was also used by Tipu Sultan (1751 - 1799) as a summer retreat. The most popular hill stations in India include:

 Achabal, Jammu and Kashmir
 Amarkantak, Madhya Pradesh
 Ambanad Hills, Kerala
 Amboli, Maharashtra
 Almora, Uttarakhand
 Araku Valley, Andhra Pradesh
 Aritar, Sikkim
 Aru, Jammu and Kashmir
 Askot, Uttarakhand
 Auli, Uttarakhand
 Baba Budan giri, Karnataka
 Badrinath, Uttarakhand
 Baltal, Jammu and Kashmir
 Barog, Himachal Pradesh
 Berinag, Uttarakhand
 Bhaderwah, Jammu and Kashmir
 Bhowali, Uttarakhand
 Chail, Himachal Pradesh
 Chakrata, Uttarakhand
 Chamba, Himachal Pradesh
 Champhai, Mizoram
 Chaukori, Uttarakhand
 Cherrapunjee, Meghalaya
 Chikhaldara, Maharashtra 
 Chitkul, Himachal Pradesh
 Coonoor, Tamil Nadu
 Daksum, Jammu and Kashmir
 Dalhousie, Himachal Pradesh
 Daringbadi, Odisha
 Darjeeling, West Bengal
 Dawki, Meghalaya
 Diskit, Ladakh
 Doodhpathri, Jammu and Kashmir
 Dhanaulti, Uttarakhand
 Dharamkot, Himachal Pradesh
 Dharchula, Uttarakhand
 Dras, Ladakh
 Dzuluk, Sikkim
 Dzüko Valley, Nagaland and Manipur
 Gairsain, Uttarakhand
 Gangtok, Sikkim
 Ghum, West Bengal
 Gulmarg, Jammu and Kashmir
 Geyzing, Sikkim
 Haflong, Assam
 Hemkund Sahib, Uttarakhand
 Hmuifang, Mizoram
 Kalpa, Himachal Pradesh
 Jogindernagar, Himachal Pradesh
 Jogimatti, Karnataka
 Joshimath, Uttarakhand
 Kalimpong, West Bengal
 Katra, Jammu and Kashmir
 Kangra, Himachal Pradesh
 Kargil, Ladakh
 Karzok, Ladakh
 Kedarnath, Uttarakhand
 Keylong, Himachal Pradesh
 Khajjiar, Himachal Pradesh
 Kodaikanal, Tamil Nadu
 Kolli Hills, Tamil Nadu
 Kotagiri, Tamil Nadu
 Kohima, Nagaland
 Kokernag, Jammu and Kashmir
 Khandala, Maharashtra
 Kufri, Himachal Pradesh
 Kullu, Himachal Pradesh
 Kurseong, West Bengal
 Lachen, Sikkim
 Lachung, Sikkim
 Lansdowne, Uttarakhand
 Lava, West Bengal
 Leh, Ladakh
 Lonavala, Maharashtra
 Lolegaon, West Bengal
 Lunglei, Mizoram
 Mahabaleshwar, Maharashtra
 Mainpat, Chhattisgarh
 Matheran, Maharashtra
 Manali, Himachal Pradesh
 Mawsynram, Meghalaya
 McLeod Ganj, Himachal Pradesh
 Meghamalai, Tamil Nadu
 Mirik, West Bengal
 Mount Abu, Rajasthan
 Murgo, Ladakh
 Munnar, Kerala
 Munsiyari, Uttarakhand
 Mussoorie, Uttarakhand
 Nainital, Uttarakhand
 Narkanda, Himachal Pradesh
 New Tehri, Uttarakhand
 Ooty (Udhagamandalam), Tamil Nadu
 Pachmarhi, Madhya Pradesh
 Palampur, Himachal Pradesh
 Pahalgam, Jammu and Kashmir
 Patnitop, Jammu and Kashmir
 Pauri, Uttarakhand
 Pelling, Sikkim
 Pfütsero, Nagaland
 Pithoragarh, Uttarakhand
 Ramgarh, Uttarakhand
 Ranikhet, Uttarakhand
 Reckong Peo, Himachal Pradesh
 Reiek, Mizoram
 Rishyap, West Bengal
 Samsing, West Bengal
 Saputara, Gujarat
 Shillong, Meghalaya
 Shimla, Himachal Pradesh
 Sonamarg, Jammu and Kashmir
 Soordelu Hill Station, Kerala
 Tawang, Arunachal Pradesh
 Thekkady, Kerala
 Triund, Himachal Pradesh
 Tosa Maidan, Jammu and Kashmir
 Topslip, Tamil Nadu
 Turtuk, Ladakh
 Uttarkashi, Uttarakhand
 Valparai, Tamil Nadu
 Vagamon, Kerala
 Verinag, Jammu and Kashmir
 Wilson Hills, Gujarat
 Yercaud Tamil Nadu
 Yelagiri Tamil Nadu
 Yusmarg, Jammu and Kashmir
 Yuksom, Sikkim
 Yumthang, Sikkim

Indonesia 

 Garut in, West Java
 Sukabumi in West Java
 Puncak in West Java
 Batu in East Java
 Tretes in East Java
 Kaliurang in Central Java
 Munduk in Bali
 Bedugul  in Bali
 Berastagi  in North Sumatra
 Lembang in West Java
 Baturaden in Central Java
 Wonosobo in Central Java
 Tawangmangu in Central Java
 Bandungan, Semarang in Central Java
 Bukittinggi in West Sumatra
 Padang Panjang in West Sumatra
 Sawahlunto in West Sumatra
 Solok in West Sumatra
 Payakumbuh in West Sumatra
 Takengon in Aceh
 Tomohon in North Sulawesi
 Tana Toraja in South Sulawesi
 Malino in South Sulawesi
 Salatiga in Central Java

Iraq 

 Shaqlawa
 Amedi
 Rawanduz
 Sulaymaniyah
 Batifa

Israel 
 Metula
 Safed

Japan 

 Hakone
 Karuizawa
 Nikkō
 Lake Chūzenji

Jordan 
A few suburbs in Amman

Malaysia

Myanmar 

 Kalaw
 Pyin Oo Lwin 
 Taunggyi 
 Thandaung

Nepal 

 Pokhara
 Namche Bazaar
 Bandipur
 Dhulikhel
 Tansen
 Nagarkot
 Kakani
 Gorkha Bazaar
 Daman
 Dharan
 Dhankuta
 Illam
 Lumle
 Kaande
 Sarangkot
 Baglung
 Resunga
 Jomsom
 Dingboche
 Kunde
 Khumjung
 Lukla
 Tengboche
 Phortse
 Bhimeshwar
 Besisahar
 Sandhikharka
 Tamghas
 Jomsom
 Thame
 Pangboche
 Phakding
 Simikot
 Dunai, Nepal

Pakistan 

Khyber Pakhtunkhwa 
 Abbottabad
 Behrain
 Kalam Valley
 Malam Jabba
 Nathia Gali
 Shogran
 Chitral
 Jahaz Banda
 Naran
 Kaghan

Punjab
 Bhurban
 Charra Pani
 Murree
 Patriata

Sindh
 Gorakh Hill
 Bado Hill Station

Balochistan
 Ziarat

Gilgit Baltistan
 Hunza Valley
 Skardu
 Astore Valley
 Gilgit
 Nagar Valley

Philippines 

 Baguio
 Salvador Benedicto
 Mambukal
 Tagaytay
 Sagada
 Malaybalay

Sri Lanka 

 Nuwara Eliya

Syria 

 Bloudan
 Masyaf
 Qadmous
 Zabadani
 Madaya

Vietnam 

 Da Lat
 Sa Pa
 Tam Đảo
 Bà Nà Hills
 Bạch Mã National Park

Oceania

Australia

Victoria
 Mount Macedon
 Harrietville

South Australia
 Mount Gambier
 Adelaide Hills

Queensland
 Toowoomba
 Merewether
 The Gap
 Chapel Hill
 Bardon
 Ferny Grove
 Buderim
 New Auckland
 Mount Archer

Western Australia
 Lesmurdie
 Kalamunda
 Jarrahdale
 Bedfordale

New South Wales
 Blue Mountains
 Mount Pleasant
 Woonoona
 Kariong
 Illawarra escarpment (Stanwell Tops)
 Prospect Hill (Pemulwuy)
 Terrey Hills
 Berowra Heights

See also 
 Tierra templada
 Tierra fría
 Plateau
 Tableland
 Mesa

References

Bibliography 

 Crossette, Barbara. The Great Hill Stations of Asia. .
 Kennedy, Dane. The Magic Mountains: Hill Stations and the British Raj (Full text, searchable). Berkeley: University of California Press, 1996. , .

External links 

Hill Stations in Nepal

Hill and mountain resorts
Types of towns
History of European colonialism